Annkathrin Kammeyer (born 12 January 1990) is a German Social Democratic politician and Member of the Hamburg Parliament since 7 March 2011.

Life and work
Born in Horn, Hamburg, she was raised in a political family, Kammeyer had an early interest in politics. After her final exams at the Charlotte-Paulsen-Gymnasium in 2009, she started studying political science at the University of Hamburg.

Political career
Kammeyer joined the SPD in 2006. She became the group leader of the Jusos (Young Socialists in the SPD) in Horn and deputy district chairman of the Jusos in Hamburg-Mitte.

From 2008 she worked in the office of Member of the Hamburg Parliament Michael Neumann. After her finals, she supported the Johannes Kahrs' campaign for the Bundestag. She also was active for AStA at the University of Hamburg.

Kammeyer ran as a candidate for the SPD in the 2011 Hamburg state election, in voting district 2 of Billstedt-Wilhelmsburg-Finkenwerder. She was elected, despite being only 46th on the SPD party list. On 7 March 2011, she became the youngest member of the Hamburg Parliament in history, at 21 years of age.

References

External links

 Annkathrin Kammeyer on abgeordnetenwatch.de 
 Annkathrin Kammeyer on wahl.de 

1990 births
Living people
Social Democratic Party of Germany politicians
Women members of State Parliaments in Germany
Members of the Hamburg Parliament
University of Hamburg alumni
21st-century German women politicians